The Melbourne Teachers College was an Australian tertiary training institution located on Grattan Street, Carlton. It was renamed the Melbourne State College and then the Melbourne College of Advanced Education. In 1989 it became part of the University of Melbourne.

Gryphon Gallery, 1888 Building
During the 1970s and until 1994 the Gryphon Gallery, in the 1888 Building, exhibited art by college lecturers. It was a condition of employment that lecturers in art and drama were required to be practicing exhibiting artists.

In 1977, Noel Flood (head  of the Department of Ceramics) and John Teschendorff (lecturer in ceramics) held a two-man show titled "Recent Handcrafts and Other Objects", making a mocking reference to the popular view at the time of pottery as craft. The Gryphon Gallery also exhibited student work.

The 1888 building housed the Melbourne Teachers’ College until 1994. Features include stained glass windows and ceramic tiled portraits commemorating the staff and students who served in the First World War. The stained glass windows include a roll call of those staff and students.

References

Education in Melbourne
University of Melbourne buildings
Buildings and structures in the City of Melbourne (LGA)
Buildings and structures completed in 1888
1888 establishments in Australia